The  is a Japanese high-speed Shinkansen train type operated by East Japan Railway Company (JR East) on the Tohoku Shinkansen high-speed lines in Japan since 1997. They are formed in 8- and 10-car sets. The 8-car sets were used on the Hokuriku Shinkansen, and the 10-car sets are on Tohoku Shinkansen services. The 10-car sets can be coupled to E3 series sets using couplers hidden behind retracting nose doors.

A total of 502 vehicles (14 8-car "N" sets and 39 10-car "J" sets) were built between 1997 and 2010, with the first withdrawals commencing in late 2013.

Operations

Tohoku Shinkansen
 Yamabiko
 Nasuno

Past operations

Hokuriku Shinkansen
 Asama (1 October 1997 - 31 March 2017)

Joetsu Shinkansen
 Asahi
 Toki
 Tanigawa

Variants
 E2 series 8-car "N" sets
 E2' series 10-car "J" sets
 E2-1000 series 10-car "J" sets

8-car "N" sets

The fleet of thirteen "N" sets was constructed for the new Asama services on the newly constructed Nagano Shinkansen (present-day Hokuriku Shinkansen) to Nagano from 1 October 1997, and are classified simply "E2 series". Units N2 onwards were delivered from March 1997 to September 1997. Tohoku Shinkansen set J1 was transferred to Nagano depot in October 2002 and renumbered as set N21.

The fleet of "N" sets underwent a programme of life-extension refurbishment from fiscal 2013.

Withdrawals of E2 series "N" sets commenced in April 2014, with the withdrawal of sets N4 and N12. The remaining E2 series sets were removed from regularly scheduled Hokuriku Shinkansen Asama services from 25 December 2015, with the last E2 series Asama run taking place on 31 March 2017.

Formation

Cars 4 and 6 are equipped with PS205 scissors-type pantographs.

Fleet list
, the fleet was as follows:

E2' series 10-car "J" sets

The initial fleet of six "J" sets was constructed as eight-car trains for the start of the new Akita shinkansen services starting in March 1997, and ran in conjunction with E3 series Akita Shinkansen units on Tōhoku Shinkansen Yamabiko/Komachi services between Tokyo and Morioka. These sets are classified E2', and are equipped with retractable nose-end couplers at the Morioka end. Units J2 onwards were delivered from December 1996 to March 1997.

As with the Nagano Shinkansen N units, these sets are also compatible with both 50 Hz and 60 Hz (25 kV) power supplies, and were also used on Nagano Shinkansen Asama services before they were lengthened to ten cars. A further four J sets were delivered in October/November 1998 to augment the fleet to coincide with the introduction E2 series stock on four return Asahi services between Tokyo and Niigata on the Jōetsu Shinkansen from the start of the revised timetable in December 1998. From September 2002, the fleet of J sets (except J1) was augmented from 8 to 10 cars with the addition of newly built intermediate cars for use on Hayate services to Hachinohe commencing in December 2002. The red stripe on these lengthened sets was also changed to magenta, and the original "wind" bodyside logo was changed to the new Hayate logo.

Withdrawals of E2 series "J" sets commenced in October 2013, with the withdrawal of sets J2 and J3. The last remaining original "J" sets were withdrawn before the start of the revised timetable on 16 March 2019.

Formation

Cars 4 and 6 are equipped with PS205 scissors-type pantographs.

Fleet list

E2-1000 series 10-car "J" sets

The prototype E2-1000 series train (unit J51) was delivered as an 8-car to Sendai depot in late December 2000, and entered revenue-earning service in November 2001 after extensive testing. Units J52 onwards were delivered as 10-car units from July 2002, entering service on the Tohoku Shinkansen from December 2002. These trains replaced life-expired 200 series trains and augment JR East's fleet for use on new Hayate services following the opening of the Tōhoku Shinkansen extension to Hachinohe in December 2002.

The E2-1000 series incorporates a number of design improvements compared with the earlier batches, the most noticeable of which is the change from small windows for each seating bay to wide windows similar to the E4 series trains. A new single-arm pantograph design is used with an aerofoil-shaped mounting that eliminates the need for pantograph shrouds. The pre-series set, J51, was equipped with automatic couplers at both ends, but sets J52 onwards have couplers at the northern end only, as on the earlier E2' trains. Unlike the earlier J sets, these units are only compatible with the 50 Hz power supply of the Tohoku and Joetsu Shinkansen routes. The flush-fitting plug doors of the earlier N and J sets were replaced by conventional sliding doors on these units. While J51 was delivered in the same livery as earlier E2 series trains, units J52 onward were delivered from new in the Hayate livery with a magenta waistline stripe in place of the previous red and a new "apple" logo in place of the "wind" logo on the original batch of J and N units.

Withdrawals of E2-1000 series sets commenced in March 2019, beginning with set J51.

Formation

Cars 4 and 6 are equipped with PS207 single-arm pantographs. Car 1 of set No. J51 is numbered E223-1101.

Fleet list

Pre-series units
The pre-series E2' series unit S7 (renumbered as J1 and later as N21) was delivered in April 1995, with S6 (now numbered as N1) delivered in June of the same year. Visually, these two units differed from subsequent production standard units in having large pantograph shields resembling the original 300 series design. These were later changed to the current low-profile design.

Interior

Test running
An E2-1000 series train (J56) broke the Japanese rail speed record for a production train (i.e. not a dedicated test train) in April 2003 when it reached a speed of  during a series of late-night high-speed test runs between Urasa and Niigata on the Joetsu Shinkansen.

Special liveries 

To celebrate 150 years of rail transport in Japan, JR East announced plans in 2022 to repaint a set into a livery similar to that of the 200 series when they first entered service in 1982. The special livery was painted on set J66 and introduced on 8 June 2022.

Exports

China ordered a number of  trains based on the E2-1000 series design, renamed it as CRH2, becoming the second Shinkansen train exported after the 700T for Taiwan. These CRH2 trains consist of a total of 60 sets; the first three sets (2001-2003) were built in Japan, the next six sets were delivered in complete knock down (CKD) form and assembled by CSR Sifang Locomotive and Rolling Stock, the remaining 51 sets were built by Sifang through technology transfer from Japan. The first train arrived at the port of Qingdao on 8 March 2006.

Subsequent orders included 50 additional trains and a new order for 140 trains placed in 2009 with the Sino-Japanese joint venture.

Withdrawals
Withdrawals of E2 series sets commenced in October 2013, with the withdrawal of sets J2 and J3.

Preserved examples
Car E223-23 of former set J10 was moved from Sendai Depot to Sanwa Tekki Corporation in Utsunomiya, Tochigi, in February 2017, where it is preserved.

Car E224-127 of former set J14 was moved from Sendai Depot to the Hirosawa City theme park in Chikusei, Ibaraki, in November 2018, where it is preserved.

See also
 List of high speed trains

References

External links

 E2 Series Hayate/Yamabiko/Nasuno 

Shinkansen train series
East Japan Railway Company
Hitachi multiple units
Tokyu Car multiple units
Train-related introductions in 1997
Passenger trains running at least at 250 km/h in commercial operations
25 kV AC multiple units
Kawasaki multiple units
Nippon Sharyo multiple units